Deh-e Ali Ahmad-e Lek Zayi (also Romanized as Deh-e ʿAlī Aḩmad-e Lek Zāyī) is a village in Qorqori Rural District, Qorqori District, Hirmand County, Sistan and Baluchestan Province, Iran. At the 2006 census, its population was 33, in 6 families.

References 

Populated places in Hirmand County